The 2022 McDonald's All-American Girls Game is an all-star basketball game that is scheduled be held on March 29, 2022. The game's rosters featured the best and most highly recruited high school girls graduating in the class of 2022. The game will be the 20th annual version of the McDonald's All-American Game first played in 2002. Due to the impact of the COVID-19 pandemic, the game has not been held since 2019.
The 24 players were selected from over 700 nominees by a committee of basketball experts. They were chosen not only for their on-court skills, but for their performances off the court as well.

Rosters

Eleven of the 24 players will be heading to the Pac-12 Conference, while the SEC and ACC each grabbed 5. Arizona, Oregon, Oregon State, South Carolina, Stanford, UCLA, and UConn each lead the way with 2 McDonald's All-Americans.

References

External links
McDonald's All-American on the web

2022 in American women's basketball
2022